A martinet is a type of whip. Martinet is also a French name and may refer to:

People
André Martinet, French linguist
Charles Martinet, American actor
François-Nicolas Martinet, French ornithologist
Jean Martinet, French drillmaster
Jean-Louis Martinet, French composer
Jeanne Martinet, French semiotician
Louis Martinet, French rower who competed in the 1900 Summer Olympics
Louis Martinet (painter), French painter, art gallery owner, and theatre director
Pierre Martinet, French spy

Places
Le Martinet, a commune in Languedoc-Roussillon, France
Martinet, Vendée, a commune in the Pays de Loire, France

Other
Martinet (Dungeons & Dragons), a fictional character
The Miles Martinet aircraft
The SNCAC Martinet aircraft